Elachista apina is a moth of the family Elachistidae. It is found in North America in British Columbia, Oregon and Washington.

The costa in the basal eighth of the forewings is greyish brown. The wing is otherwise unicolorous white. The hindwings are white and the underside of the wings is silky light grey.

Etymology
The species name is derived from Greek  ('clean').

References

Moths described in 1997
apina
Endemic fauna of the United States
Moths of North America